The Metropolitan Cathedral of the Annunciation, popularly known as the Metropolis or Mitropoli, is the cathedral church of the Archbishopric of Athens and all of Greece.

History 
Construction of the cathedral began on Christmas Day, 1842 with the laying of the cornerstone by King Otto and Queen Amalia. Construction started under the architect Theophil Hansen and was continued by Dimitris Zezos, Panagis Kalkos and François Boulanger.

Workers used marble from 72 demolished churches to build the cathedral's immense walls. Three architects and 20 years later, it was completed. On May 21, 1862, the completed cathedral was dedicated to the Annunciation of the Mother of God (Ευαγγελισμός της Θεοτόκου) by the King and Queen. Inside are the tombs of two saints killed by the Ottoman Turks during the Ottoman period: Saint Philothei and Patriarch Gregory V.

 Saint Philothei built a convent, was martyred in 1589, and her bones are still visible in a silver reliquary. She is honored for ransoming Greek women enslaved in Ottoman Empire's harems.
 Gregory V the Ethnomartyr, Patriarch of Constantinople, was hanged by order of Sultan Mahmud II and his body thrown into the Bosphorus in 1821, in retaliation for the Greek uprising on March 25, leading to the Greek War of Independence. His body was rescued by Greek sailors and eventually enshrined in Athens.

To the immediate south of the cathedral is the little Church of St. Eleftherios also called the "Little Mitropoli."

In the square in front of the cathedral stand two statues. The first is that of Constantine XI, the last emperor of the Eastern Roman Empire. The second is a statue of Archbishop Damaskinos who was Archbishop of Athens during World War II and was Regent for King George II and Prime Minister of Greece in 1946.

The Metropolitan Cathedral remains a major landmark in Athens and the site of important ceremonies with national political figures present, as well as weddings and funerals of notable personalities.

Gallery

Sources
Sacred Destinations
Church of Greece

Cathedrals in Athens
Eastern Orthodox church buildings in Athens
Greek Orthodox cathedrals in Greece
1862 establishments in Greece
Church buildings with domes